The master suppression techniques is a framework articulated in 1945 by the Norwegian psychologist and philosopher Ingjald Nissen. These techniques identified by Nissen are ways to indirectly suppress and humiliate opponents. In the late 1970s, the framework was popularized by Norwegian social psychologist Berit Ås, who reduced Nissen's original nine means to five, and claimed this was a technique mostly used in the workplace by men against women. Master suppression techniques are defined as strategies of social manipulation by which a dominant group maintains such a position in a (established or unexposed) hierarchy. They are very prominent in Scandinavian scholarly and public debate, where the expression is also used to refer to types of social manipulation not part of Ås's framework. Master suppression techniques are sometimes called domination techniques.

The five master suppression techniques according to Ås

Making invisible
Silencing or otherwise marginalizing people in opposition by ignoring them.

Examples: 
 A speaker claims ownership of an idea belonging to an opponent.
 When it is the opponent's turn to speak, other attendees start to talk to each other or browse through their papers to undermine what the opponent is saying.

Ridicule

Portraying the arguments of an opponent, or the opponents themselves, in a ridiculing fashion.

Example:

 Telling an opponent that they look cute when they are angry while they are trying to make an accusation of wrongdoing against someone.

Withholding information
Excluding a person from the decision making process, or knowingly not forwarding information so as to make the person less able to make an informed choice.

Examples: 
 Not including one in a meeting about a matter that concerns them.
 Decisions are made not in a conference where everyone is present, but at a dinner party later in the evening where only some attendants have been invited.

Double bind

Punishing or otherwise belittling the actions of an opponent, regardless of how they act.

Example: 
 Despite doing tasks thoroughly, the opponent receives complaints for being too slow. When tasks are done efficiently, the opponent receives complaints of being sloppy.

Heaping blame/putting to shame
Embarrassing someone or insinuating that they themselves are to blame for their position.

Example: 
 When raising concerns about being slandered, the opponent is told that it is their fault since they (for example) dress provocatively.

Later additions by Ås
Berit Ås has since added two supplementary master suppression techniques.

Objectifying

Discussing the appearance of one or several persons in a situation where it is irrelevant.

Force/threat of force
Threatening with or using one's physical strength towards one or several persons.

Example:
 "One more word from you and I'll smash your face!"

Countermeasures against master suppression techniques
A group of PhD students at Stockholm University has formulated five counter strategies:
 Take place
 Questioning
 The cards on the table
 Break the pattern
 Intellectualise

They have also formulated five confirmation techniques:
 Visualizing
 Adherence
 Inform
 Double reward
 Confirm reasonable standards

The Centre for Gender Equality in Norway has also published an article about how to combat this phenomenon.

See also

 Psychological manipulation

References

External links
 Berit Ås: Master Suppression Techniques

Abuse
Rhetoric
Feminist theory